Saccharomyces cariocanus, a type of yeast in the Saccharomyces sensu stricto complex. Its type strain is NCYC 2890T. Analyses did not confirm the previously observed conspecificity with Saccharomyces paradoxus. S. cariocanus exhibits postzygotic isolation from representative strains from all known geographical populations of S. paradoxus: European, Far-East Asian, North American and Hawaiian.

References

Further reading

External links
UniProt entry

cariocanus
Yeasts used in brewing
Fungi described in 2000